The 188th "Barak" (Lightning) Armored Brigade is an Israeli armored brigade, subordinate to Israel's Northern Regional Command. The emblem of the Barak Armored Brigade is a red-bordered rhombus bearing a sword against a blue and white background depicting the Haifa coastline. The brigade has a long history beginning before the foundation of the State of Israel.

In 1990 the brigade was the first to adopt the Merkava mark-III main battle tank, phasing out its older Centurion tanks.
The brigade is now phasing out the mark-III tanks and by end of July 2020 will be using only mark-IVs.

History

The brigade was formed as the 2nd Brigade during the 1948 Arab-Israeli war, when it was split off from the Levanoni Brigade. Named the Carmeli Brigade because it was led by Moshe Carmel, the brigade was an infantry formation operating in northern Israel. It played an important part in Operation Hiram. After the IDF was formed, the Carmeli Brigade became its 18th Brigade.

During the Sinai Campaign of 1956, the brigade was stationed along the Jordanian border, in case the Jordanians decided to open a second front, and was thus not involved in combat.
It was shortly later assigned armored units to become the 45th Armored Brigade, also known as the "Barak Armored Brigade". It consisted of one tank battalion, two armored infantry battalions, a mortar battalion and reconnaissance units. The changeover was completed in 1962.

During the Yom Kippur War, it played an important role defending Israel's border against the Syrian attack in the southern Golan Heights. 112 soldiers were killed in action, including the brigade commander. The brigade was almost completely destroyed. The main Syrian attack at 14:30–14:50 PM, confronted by the newly positioned 74th Tank Battalion, under the command of Lt.Col. Yair Nafshi. Nafshi moved his battalion position 1.5 km forward from its previous defensive position, a maneuver that saved his men and machines from the Syrian artillery barrage. His was the only remaining tank force, equipped with 36 Israeli modified Centurion tanks to fight the Syrians for 3 continuous days, until reinforcements and reserves were moved into positions. His battalion was reinforced with a tank company from the 53rd battalion. After 4 days of fighting, his battalion was reduced to 5 operational tanks. More than 102 soldiers and officers died defending the southern Golan Line, from reinforced points (bunkers) 107 to 114. For his gallant, professional, and courageous behavior during the war, Yair Nafshi received Israel's second highest decoration, the Medal of Valor. He retired from the army with the rank of Brigadier General.

During the battle, Lieutenant Zvika Greengold, who had arrived unattached to any unit, fought off attacks with his single tank until help arrived. "For the next 20 hours, Zvika Force, as he came to be known on the radio net, fought running battles with Syrian tanks—sometimes alone, sometimes as part of a larger unit, changing tanks half a dozen times as they were knocked out. He was wounded and burned but stayed in action and repeatedly showed up at critical moments from an unexpected direction to change the course of a skirmish."

After the war, the task of rebuilding the brigade was assigned in part to Yonatan Netanyahu who took command of battalion 71. In the 1982 Lebanon War, it fought in Beirut and participated in the capture of the local airport. Today, the brigade is part of the 36th Armored Division, the largest regular service armored division in the IDF.

Units
 53rd "Sufa" (Storm) Armor Battalion (Merkava Mk.4)
 71st "Reshef" (flash) Armor Battalion (Merkava Mk.4)
 74th "Saar" (Tempest) Armor Battalion (Merkava Mk.4)
 605th "haMahatz"(המח״ץ) (stands for breakthrough, laying mines, explosives and crossing ) Armored Engineer Battalion
 Sayeret 188 Armored Reconnaissance Company
 Anti-Tank Guided Missile Company

List of  Carmeli Brigade operations in the 1948 Arab–Israeli war
 Operation Ben-Ami
 Operation Dekel (one battalion)
 Operation Hiram
 Operation Misparayim

List of villages and town battles the Carmeli Brigade fought
 Al-Nahr
 Al-Ghabisiyya
 Al-Sumayriyya
 Al-Tall
 Al-Kabri
 Al-Mansura
 Haifa (the Arab quarters)
 Umm al-Faraj

Memorial
The memorial is situated in the Golan Heights at Road 91 near the entrance to Nahal Gilbon and the former Syrian village Aleiqa. It is inscribed with a verse from a Hebrew song, citing Jeremiah 17:8: "A person is like a tree planted by water, seeking roots."

References

External links

 IDF
 CODENAME:CAPITAL, By Hedi Enghelberg, 2009. Digital Edition on http://www.amazon.com

1948 Arab–Israeli War
Brigades of Israel
Northern Command (Israel)